is a Japanese amateur astronomer and discoverer of minor planets.

He is credited by the Minor Planet Center with the discovery of 45 asteroids he made between 1987 and 2000. Takuo Kojima also writes a regular column for the astronomy magazine Gekkan Temmon titled the "Comet Observers Guide. The main-belt asteroid 3644 Kojitaku is named after him.

List of discovered minor planets

References 
 

20th-century Japanese astronomers
Discoverers of asteroids

Living people
Year of birth missing (living people)
21st-century Japanese astronomers